Raghuvir Sharan Mitra was an Indian poet, novelist and essayist of Hindi literature. Born in 1919, he is the author of poem anthologies such as Jeevan ke Panne, Bhāratodaya and Sindhu Sarovara, novels like Rakt Surya and Aag aur Paani, and essays such as Kāi aura Kamala and Bhūmijā. The Government of India awarded him the fourth highest Indian civilian honour of Padma Shri in 1983.

See also

 Hindi literature

References

Recipients of the Padma Shri in literature & education
1919 births
1996 deaths
Indian male poets
Indian male novelists
Indian male essayists
Hindi-language poets
20th-century Indian essayists
20th-century Indian novelists
20th-century Indian poets
20th-century Indian male writers